
Mercator (Latin for "merchant") may refer to:

People
 Marius Mercator (c. 390–451), a Catholic ecclesiastical writer

 Arnold Mercator, a 16th-century cartographer
 Gerardus Mercator, a 16th-century cartographer
 Mercator 1569 world map
 Mercator projection, a cartographic projection devised by Gerardus Mercator
 Rumold Mercator, a 16th-century cartographer

 Nicholas Mercator, a 17th-century mathematician
 Mercator series, a representation of the natural logarithm

Companies and universities
 Mercator (retail), a Slovenian supermarket chain
  Mercator-S, a retail company in Serbia, part of Agrokor Group
 Mercator School of Management, University of Duisburg-Essen, Germany
 Mercator Limited, a shipping company in India
 Mercator Corporation, a consulting firm and investment bank formed by James Giffen, involved with Kazakhgate

Vehicles
 Mercator (ship), a barquentine museum ship in Oostende, Belgium
 P4M Mercator, a reconnaissance aircraft used by the United States Navy during the 1950s
 QinetiQ Mercator, a British unmanned aerial vehicle (UAV)

Other
 Mercator Telescope, a Belgian telescope installed in La Palma, Canary Islands
 Mercator K55K, a type of pocketknife produced in Germany
 Mercator (play), a comedic play by Plautus
 IBM InfoSphere DataStage, software whose component DataStage TX was formerly known as Mercator and is now called WebSphere Transformation Extender
 "Mercator", a song by P-MODEL from the album Perspective II
 Mercator (crater), a lunar impact crater on the southwestern edge of Mare Nubium

See also
Kaufmann (German)
Kofman or Koffman (Dutch)
Marchant (French)
Merchant (surname)

Latin-language surnames